Joseph Dale (3 July 1921 – 11 September 2000) was an English footballer who played in the English Football League for Manchester United and Port Vale, as well as playing for Witton Albion in three Cheshire County League winning seasons (1948–49, 1949–50 and 1953–54).

Career
Dale made his debut for Witton Albion on 20 April 1940, and scored one goal in five games in the 1939–40 season. He scored 22 goals in 39 games in the 1946–47 season. He transferred to Manchester United in June 1947. He made his United debut on 27 September 1947 in a 2–1 win at Preston North End. He only played one further game before he was bought by Port Vale for 'a substantial fee' (£1,000) in April 1948. He made his debut in a 1–0 home defeat by Walsall on 10 April 1948, but again failed to win a first team spot. He scored one goal in his next eight appearances before old club Witton Albion put in a then-Cheshire League record fee to bring him back to the club in October 1948. He scored 21 goals in 33 games in the 1948–49 Cheshire County League title winning season, 20 goals in 37 games in the 1949–50 Cheshire County League title winning season, 15 goals in 33 games in the 1950–51 season, 8 goals in 25 games in the 1951–52 season, 17 goals in 44 games in the 1952–53 season, 24 goals in 48 games in the 1953–54 Cheshire County League title winning season, 8 goals in 24 games in the 1954–55 season, 14 goals in 21 games in the 1955–56 season, 12 goals in 28 games in the 1956–57 season, 6 goals in 18 games in the 1957–58 season and made one final appearance in the 1958–59 campaign.

Career statistics

Honours
Witton Albion
Cheshire County League: 1948–49, 1949–50, 1953–54

References

1921 births
2000 deaths
Sportspeople from Northwich
English footballers
Association football midfielders
Witton Albion F.C. players
Manchester United F.C. players
Port Vale F.C. players
English Football League players